Petra Janů (born Jana Petrů, 19 November 1952) is a Czech singer and actress. She won the 1987 Zlatý slavík for Female Singer of the Year, ahead of Iveta Bartošová and Bára Basiková. She won the same award again in 1988 and 1989.

Discography

Studio albums
 Album (1997)
 Jedeme dál II (2000)
 Vzpomínky: Film & Muzikál (2009)
 Kouzlo (2009)

Live albums
 Live v Lucerně (2015)

Awards and nominations

References

External links

 
 
 

1952 births
Living people
Czechoslovak women singers
Actresses from Prague
Musicians from Prague
Zlatý slavík winners
20th-century Czech women singers
21st-century Czech women singers